Pimp to Eat is the only studio album by American hip hop supergroup Analog Brothers, which consists of Ice-T as Ice Oscillator, Kool Keith as Keith Korg, Pimpin' Rex as Rex Roland JX3P, Marc Live as Marc Moog, and Black Silver as Silver Synth. It was released on August 15, 2000 via Ground Control Records and re-released on June 10, 2016 via Mello Music Group. The 16-track record featured guest appearances from Odd Oberheim, H-Bomb, Teflon, Rhymes Syndicate, Synth-A-Size Sisters, and DJ Cisco.

Singles 

The album produced a 12" vinyl single "2005 A.D.", which was dropped on May 16, 2000 via Ground Control Records. Its A-side were two versions of "2005", master mix version with Odd Oberhiem and instrumental version. Its B-side were two versions of "Analog Annihilator vs. Silver Surfer", also master mix and instrumental.

The second single, "Bionic Oldsmobile", was dropped on June 10, 2016 on Mello Music Group's re-release version and is available as free download.

Music videos 

Music video for "Country Girl" was directed and edited by Pimp Rex & Kool Keith, and music video for "More Freaks" was directed by Gorilaman X.

Track listing 

Sample credits
Track 2 contains elements from "Music to Be Murdered By" by Jeff Alexander & Alfred Hitchcock (1958)

Personnel

Christopher Rodgers - vocals, synthesizer, lazar bells
Rex Colonel Doby Jr. - vocals, keyboards, drums
Tracy Lauren Marrow - vocals, keyboards, drums
Keith Matthew Thornton - vocals, bass, strings
Marc Giveand - vocals, violins, drums
Kurt Kurzweil Matlin - mixing
Gene Grimaldi - mastering
Dr. Dave Stotts - photography
Odd Oberhiem - featured artist (tracks: 2, 4)
Sean Merrick - featured artist (tracks: 10, 12)
Sheldon Harris - featured artist (track 15)
Rhyme Syndicate - featured artist (track 8)
DJ Cisco - featured artist (track 10)
Synth-A-Size Sisters - featured artist (track 14)

References

External links

2000 debut albums
Kool Keith albums
Ice-T albums
Hardcore hip hop albums
Alternative hip hop albums by American artists